Deb Amlen (born April 22, 1962) is a humor writer and crossword puzzle constructor whose work has been featured in The New York Times, The Washington Post, Los Angeles Times, and other national publications.

Career
She is on the team that constructs the American Values Club crossword (formerly The Onion The A.V. Club crossword), edited by Ben Tausig, and is the "X Games" columnist for BUST Magazine. As of January 2011, Amlen is the New York Times' official blogger writing about The New York Times crossword puzzle at Wordplay.
She is also a graduate of the Bronx High School of Science class of 1980.

She is the author of It's Not PMS, It's You (2010, Sterling Publishing), a humorous look at the possible biological reasons behind why men act the way they do. Amlen's second book is "Create Your Life Lists" (2011, Sterling Publishing), a hands-on guide to writing life lists.

References

External links
 NY Times contributions

Living people
American humorists
1962 births
21st-century American women writers